Kadriana Lott (born May 12, 1999 as Kadriana Sahaidak) is a Canadian curler from Gimli, Manitoba. She is best known for playing mixed doubles curling with partner Colton Lott, who she has won three medals with at the Canadian Mixed Doubles Curling Championship. She also plays lead on Team Darcy Robertson in women's curling.

Career

Mixed doubles
Lott has found success in mixed doubles with husband Colton Lott. Their first competitive event was the 2018 Manitoba Mixed Doubles Curling Championship, which they won, giving them a berth in the 2018 Canadian Mixed Doubles Curling Championship. The duo was the youngest in the tournament, and the only to go undefeated through the round robin. However, they lost the final 8–7 to Laura Crocker and Kirk Muyres.

The team was Canada's representative at the Third Leg of the 2018–19 Curling World Cup. They won the event, gaining an entry to the Grand Final. At the 2019 Canadians, the pair made it to the semi-finals, which they lost 7–6.

Personal life
Lott works as an optometric assistant at Oakley Vision Centre. She married mixed doubles partner Colton Lott in August 2022.

References
2

External links
 

Living people
Canadian women curlers
Curlers from Manitoba
People from Gimli, Manitoba
1999 births
Sportspeople from Selkirk, Manitoba